Van Buren County is a county located in the U.S. state of Iowa. As of the 2020 census the population was 7,203, making it the state's tenth-least populous county. The county seat is Keosauqua, which contains the oldest continuously operational courthouse in the state of Iowa, and second oldest in the United States.

History

Van Buren County was formed on December 7, 1836, as a part of Wisconsin Territory, and was split off from Des Moines County. It was named for President Martin Van Buren. It became a part of Iowa Territory (later the state of Iowa) when that territory was organized on July 4, 1838.

The county's courthouse was built in September 1843 in the style of Greek Revival and stands as Iowa's oldest, and the nation's second oldest, courthouse in operation.

"The Honey War" refers to a colorful episode in Van Buren County's history when the State of Missouri and Wisconsin Territory border came into dispute.  Missouri attempted to collect taxes from residents north of the disputed Sullivan Line of 1816, which residents said was not rightfully theirs to tax.  The sheriff of Van Buren County subsequently arrested and jailed the sheriff from Kahoka, Missouri, and Missourians were charged with "stealing honey from bee trees" in what is now Lacey-Keosauqua State Park. Each governor sent troops to resolve the problem but no bloodshed resulted.  The matter was turned over to the U.S. Congress for arbitration. The dispute, however, was not resolved until 1846, when Iowa became a state.  Congress ruled "in favor of Iowa, allowing the original Sullivan line of 1816 to remain intact".

Van Buren County is also home to Iowa's oldest community theater group still in operation, the "Van Buren Players," founded in 1963.

Geography

Major highways
 Iowa Highway 1
 Iowa Highway 2
 Iowa Highway 16
 Iowa Highway 98

Adjacent counties
Jefferson County  (north)
Henry County  (northeast)
Lee County  (east)
Clark County, Missouri  (southeast)
Scotland County, Missouri  (southwest)
Davis County  (west)

Demographics

2020 census
There were 3,500 housing units, of which 2,984 were occupied.

2010 census

As of the census of 2010, there were 7,570 people, 3,108 households, and 2,058 families residing in the county. The population density was  people per square mile. The racial makeup of the county was 98.3% White, 0.2% Black or African American, 0.1% Native American, 0.5% Asian, 0.2% from other races, and 0.7% from two or more races.  1.2% of the population were Hispanic or Latino of any race.

There were 3,108 households, out of which 25.4% had children under the age of 18 living with them, 55.4% were married couples living together, 7.0% had a female householder with no husband present, and 33.8% were non-families. 27.7% of all households were made up of individuals, and 33.6% had someone living alone who was 65 years of age or older.  The average household size was 2.40 and the average family size was 2.97.

In the county, the population was spread out, with 24.1% under the age of 18 and 19.8% who were 65 years of age or older.  The median age was 43.3 years. For every 100 females there were 100.6 males.

As of the 2000 census, the median income for a household in the county was $31,094, and the median income for a family was $36,420. Males had a median income of $27,379 versus $20,925 for females. The per capita income for the county was $15,748.  About 8.70% of families and 12.70% of the population were below the poverty line, including 14.00% of those under age 18 and 15.60% of those age 65 or over.

Communities

Cities

Birmingham
Bonaparte
Cantril
Farmington
Keosauqua
Milton
Stockport

Census-designated places
Douds
Leando
Mount Sterling

Unincorporated communities
Iowaville
Lebanon
Mt. Zion
Pittsburg
Selma
Winchester

Townships
According to the 1850 US Census Records.

Birmingham Township
Bonaparte Township
Cedar Township
Chequest Township
Des Moines Township
Farmington Township
Harrisburg Township
Jackson Township
Keosauqua Township
Lick Creek Township
Union Township
Van Buren Township
Vernon Township
Village Township
Washington Township

Population ranking
The population ranking of the following table is based on the 2020 census of Van Buren County.

† county seat

Politics
Van Buren County has been predominantly Republican throughout its history, voting for the Democratic candidate only six times in presidential elections from 1896 onward. However, the county was a national bellwether between 1964 & 2004, but voted Republican by wide margins in years the nation went Republican. Aside from Lyndon B. Johnson's landslide victory in 1964, the margins of victory Democrats won the county by in this 40-year period were incredibly narrow, with the difference being less than one hundred votes when Jimmy Carter & Bill Clinton won the county. From 2000 on, the county has trended strongly Republican, particularly in 2016 where Hillary Clinton received the lowest percentage by a Democratic candidate in 60 years. Clinton also failed to win even 1,000 votes, a feat which every major party candidate prior to 2016 had been able to accomplish in the county.

Education
School districts include:
 Cardinal Community School District
 Davis County Community School District
 Fairfield Community School District
 Mount Pleasant Community School District
 Van Buren County Community School District

Former school districts:
 Harmony Community School District

See also

National Register of Historic Places listings in Van Buren County, Iowa

References

External links

 Villages of Van Buren 

 
1836 establishments in Wisconsin Territory
Populated places established in 1836